Jennie Vee is a songwriter, guitarist and bassist from Sudbury, Ontario, Canada. She has played bass with Courtney Love, supported Echo and The Bunnymen and the Manic Street Preachers and played with Tamaryn.

Vee grew up listening to Hole, The Cure and Jane's Addiction and taught herself guitar. She quit high school and relocated to Southsea, England, where she recorded her first demo with her musical mentor Jim Shaw from the band Cranes. She returned to Canada and formed a band, Tuuli, who released an EP on Sympathy for the Record Industry, an LP on Linus and her songs were featured on Comedy Central and Degrassi: The Next Generation.  

She released her solo EP Die Alone in 2014 and was subsequently discovered by Love who recruited her to play bass for the Endless Summer tour with Lana Del Rey. Her first full-length album, Spying, was released the following year.

She lives in Los Angeles, California and is a touring member of Eagles of Death Metal. She has described herself as a "recovering goth", and she has cited New Order's Peter Hook as an influence on her playing, adding "I love adding a texture ... rather than sticking with the root note."

In 2021, she became the bassist for Palaye Royale.

Discography
 Die Alone (EP) (2014)
 Spying (LP) (2015)
 Suffer (LP) (2017)

References

Living people
Canadian women songwriters
Canadian rock bass guitarists
Eagles of Death Metal members
Musicians from Greater Sudbury
Women bass guitarists
1983 births